The Greek Solution (Elliniki Lisi) is a political party in Greece founded by former MP Kyriakos Velopoulos. The party is right wing to far-right and has been described as ideologically ultranationalist and right-wing populist. The party garnered 3.7% of the vote in the 2019 Greek legislative election, winning 10 out of the 300 seats in the Hellenic Parliament and 4.18% of the vote in the 2019 European Parliament election in Greece, winning one seat in the European Parliament.

History
The party was officially founded in June 2016 by journalist Kyriakos Velopoulos, formerly a Popular Orthodox Rally (LAOS) member. It had previously been announced that a new party was to be founded by him. A formal presentation of the new party took place in October 2016 at an event in the Peace and Friendship Stadium.

In the 2019 Greek legislative election, the party earned 3.7% of the vote, electing 10 MPs in the Hellenic Parliament.
In the May 2019 European Parliament election, the party won 4.2% of the vote, electing a single MEP who sits with the European Conservatives and Reformists group.

Ideology and policies
Greek Solution is a Greek ultranationalist party that emphasizes action against illegal immigration, including installation of an electric fence on Greece's border with Turkey and detaining illegal immigrants on uninhabited islands as they await deportation. The party also advocates for shutting down NGOs operating in Greece, describing them as "trafficking companies". Velopoulos has expressed admiration for Hungarian Prime Minister Viktor Orbán and the governance of his Fidesz party in Hungary, particularly the country's economic and migration policies. He has also claimed the party stands for "Greece first", in reference to U.S. President Donald Trump's America First policy agenda.

According to the party's website, Greek Solution plans to primarily invest in the primary sector of the economy and geostrategy. The party opposes the Prespa agreement and the usage of the word "Macedonia" in the name of the neighbouring Republic of North Macedonia. Greek Solution is in favour of the proclamation of an EEZ and exploitation of the mineral wealth of Greece for heavy industry. It also supports the restructuring of the educational and health system. Greek Solution supports positions that are favorable to the Greek Orthodox Church.

Greek Solution seeks friendly relations with China, India as well as Russia by taking pro-Russian stances, while being sceptical of increased defense cooperation with the United States. Greek Solution also takes a pro-Israel stance, citing strong Palestine-Turkey relations.

Election results

Hellenic Parliament

European Parliament

References

External links 
 Official website 

Political parties in Greece
Political parties established in 2016
Eastern Orthodox political parties
Nationalist parties in Greece
Conservative parties in Greece
Anti-immigration politics in Europe
National conservative parties
Right-wing populism in Greece
Right-wing populist parties
Right-wing parties in Europe
2016 establishments in Greece